The Liberal Party (PL) was a liberal political party in Spain founded in 1976.

History
The PL was initially scheduled to contest the 1977 Spanish general election within Adolfo Suárez's Union of the Democratic Centre (UCD) platform, but on 8 May 1977 the party announced that it would withdraw from the UCD and would not be contesting the upcoming election. It would then rejoin the UCD after the 1979 Spanish general election and until 1983, when it aligned itself with the People's Alliance (AP), the People's Democratic Party (PDP) and the Liberal Union (UL). On 22 December 1984 the latter merged into the Liberal Party. These three parties formed the People's Coalition for the 1986 election.

In 1989 the party, along with AP and PDP, merged to form the new People's Party (PP).

Esperanza Aguirre, now a leading PP figure, was a Liberal member.

Electoral performance

Cortes Generales

References

Liberal parties in Spain
Political parties established in 1976
Political parties disestablished in 1989
1976 establishments in Spain
1989 disestablishments in Spain
Defunct political parties in Spain
Defunct liberal political parties